The King's Stables is an archaeological site in County Armagh, Northern Ireland. The earthwork known as the King's Stables is a Scheduled Historic Monument in the townland of Tray, in Armagh City and District Council area, at grid ref: H8388 4546.

Features
It consists of a boggy hollow, originally an artificial, flat-bottomed pool about 25 metres (82 ft) in diameter, partly surrounded by an earthen bank, about 300 metres (985 ft) north-east of Haughey's Fort. It dates to the late Bronze Age, ca. 1000  BC, contemporary with Haughey's Fort. Excavations in 1975 discovered clay moulds for bronze leaf-shaped swords, pottery, and items of worked bone and wood. Also found were 214 animal bones and a human skull.

Name
The name is probably related to a local tradition that the ancient kings of Ulster watered their horses and washed their chariots in the pool.
The same name has been given to Milecastle 48 on Hadrian's Wall; in this case, the layout of the walls is reminiscent of stables.

See also
List of archaeological sites in County Armagh

References

Chris Lynn, Navan Fort: Archaeology and Myth, Wordwell Books, 2003
R. B. Warner, "The Navan Archaeological Complex: a Summary", Ulidia, December Publications, 1994

Prehistoric Ireland
Archaeological sites in County Armagh
Scheduled monuments in Northern Ireland
Horse history and evolution